TG Collective are an eclectic British-based ensemble, evolving from the successful acoustic guitar trio, Trio Gitano, in 2006.  The TG Collective are based in Birmingham, England.  Their sound draws on many influences, in particular Flamenco, Gypsy Jazz, Jazz and contemporary Classical music, with interchanging shapes and sizes of ensemble within a performance.  The group is centered on two guitarists, set alongside a core of double bass, flute and violin and percussion, whilst also featuring flamenco dance in some performances.

The band issued an album, Release the Penguins, in 2012, their first since their previous 2005 release as Trio Gitano.  Release The Penguins has received plaudits from The Sunday Times, Jazzwise, Songlines, FRoots, Time Out and Yahoo!.  The album has been played internationally, including BBC Radio 3 to KEXP-FM in Seattle, USA.  Having toured extensively around the UK, TG Collective have appeared several times at the Cheltenham Jazz Festival; Kings Place, London; live on BBC One television; Jamie Oliver's Big Feastival; the Manchester Jazz Festival; a live session for Jazz FM and London's Pizza Express Jazz Club in Soho, in addition to touring in Ireland, France, Spain, Serbia and Bulgaria.

Current band members
Jamie Fekete (guitars)
Sam Slater (guitars, oud)
Percy Pursglove (double bass, trumpet)
Holly Jones (flute, alto flute)
Lluis Mather (clarinet, bass clarinet)
Kit Massey (violin)
Joelle Barker (cajon, riq, percussion)

Trio Gitano - 2001-2006
The UK based acoustic guitar trio Trio Gitano was formed in 2001 by three 'graduate' members of the Birmingham School's Guitar Ensemble - Sam Slater, Jamie Fekete and Sophie Johnson.

The Trio was directed by composer, pianist and guitarist Bryan Lester, who still writes for The TG Collective.  After performing together throughout their time together at The University of Birmingham, the Trio signed to The Birds Recording Company indie label in 2004 to release their debut album - Who Ate All The Tapas? in August 2005, and was voted as one of the Records of the Year by The Sunday Times. The album also received notable reviews in The Times, Jazzwise Magazine, Songlines Magazine, The Metro and coverage on BBC Radios 3 and 4.

During the summer of 2006, Sophie Johnson left the Trio, with multi-instrumentalist Percy Pursglove joining the group, adding new dynamic drive and direction on double bass, which paved the way for the formation and basis of the TG Collective in September 2006.  Pursglove had previously studied Jazz at Birmingham Conservatoire and The New School in New York.

Associated acts
 Percy Pursglove 
 Joelle Barker 
 Kit Massey 
 Lluis Mather 
 Sam Slater
 The Destroyers 
 Katy Carr

Albums
 Release The Penguins
Released in summer 2012 through the Stoney Lane label, also featuring Laura Moody on cello.
 Who Ate All The Tapas? - Trio Gitano
Released in August 2005 through the Birds Recording Company as the original Trio Gitano, also featuring Bryan Corbett on trumpet and flugelhorn.

Awards
Who Ate All The Tapas? was No.4 in The Sunday Times' Records of The Year in 2005

References

External links
 Trio Gitano history
 TG Collective - official website

English jazz ensembles
Flamenco groups
English classical music groups
Musical groups from Birmingham, West Midlands
British world music groups